DAAB or Daab may refer to:

Dyersburg Army Air Base, a World War II air base in Tennessee, United States
Daab (band), a Polish reggae band
Daab (sword), a Thai single-edge sword/martial arts weapon
Data Access Application Block, a programming library in Microsoft Enterprise Library
Blida Airport, Algeria (ICAO code: DAAB)